Ousseni Labo (born June 11, 1982 in Lomé) is a Togolese footballer, who currently plays for VfL Wolbeck.

Career
Labo played formerly for FC Eintracht Rheine in the Oberliga Westfalen, he left the team on 15 May 2008. Labo formerly played for SC Verl, SV Davaria Davensberg, GW Gelmer, ESV Münster and FC Modèle da Lomé. On 4 February 2009, he signed a contract with Rot-Weiss Ahlen to play in the reserve team, but after only a half year returned to SV Davaria Davensberg in July 2009.

Position
He currently plays as left midfielder. Formerly, he played left back in Lomé, and as striker in his last club.

International career
Labo played his first game on 22 August 2007 against Zambia, appearing as substitute in minute 60.

Coaching career
He worked two years as youth coach for ESV Münster, now as U19 Assistant Coach for ESV Münster.

References

External links
 Ousseni Labo's Official Website
 
 

1982 births
Living people
Sportspeople from Lomé
Togolese footballers
Togo international footballers
Togolese expatriate footballers
Expatriate footballers in Germany
SC Verl players
Association football midfielders
CO Modèle de Lomé players
21st-century Togolese people
FC Eintracht Rheine players